The 1946 Maine gubernatorial election took place on September 9, 1946. Incumbent Republican Governor Horace Hildreth, was seeking a second term, and faced off against Democrat F. Davis Clark.  This election represented the first gubernatorial election in Maine following the end of the Second World War, and saw Hildreth easily win re-election

Results

Notes

1946
Maine
Gubernatorial
September 1946 events in the United States